Tirana Logistic Park (TLP) offers logistic services in Albania. Tirana Logistic Park is a project of 3 "Class A" warehouses and industrial premises in the biggest industrial area of Albania, along the Tirana-Durrës highway. It is the first logistic park in Albania intended to help this country to attract more foreign investment. It is one of the most important investments in Albania and one of the biggest logistic parks in South East Europe. This logistic park was open on October this year.

The design and the construction of this park sparked interest because it involved students from the Faculty of Architecture. The construction company wanted to share the experience with the students, since it is the first construction of its type in Albania.

Actually the Logistic services are guaranteed from an agreement with Milsped.

History
Tirana Logistic Park is a project designed from Mr. Samir Mane many years ago though construction did not begin until 2012. The idea of Mr. Mane was supported from the Albanian-American Enterprise Fund and the AlbStar Construction Company. Both these entities started the construction of a logistic park thought to offer services to business in South East Europe. The shareholders are  Balfin Group, Albanian-American Enterprise Fund and AlbStar Construction.

In 2013 the first phase of the construction finished and now Tirana Logistic Park is operative with the first warehouse that has a surface of 15'300 m2, roughly three football fields. The inaugural ribbon, that marked the official opening of the Logistic Park, was cut by Mr. Michael D. Granoff (Chairmen of Albanian-American Enterprise Fund), Mr. Idajet Ismailaj (Owner of AlbStar Construction), Mr. Lulzim Basha (Mayor of Tirana Municipality), Mr. Niko Peleshi (Deputy Prime Minister of Albania), Mr. Aleksandër Arvizu (US Ambassador in Albania) and Mr Samir Mane (president and CEO of Balfin Group).

Services 
The logistic park is positioned in the largest industrial area of Albania, in a demographic area that provides skilled workforce with about 1.2 million inhabitants within 30 kilometers of the site. The park is easily accessed from the main highways, is next to the railway and the port of Durrës. The park itself has a dedicated railway spur line that enables companies to transport directly to the main ports of Albania or with other countries through the international railway network. Customs facilities, to allow for direct clearance and bonded warehouse space will also be possible within the logistics park. Storage spaces include all the utilities needed for processing containers. All the services of Tirana Logistic Park are professionally managed by a staff that is currently trained for these categories of services.

Location
Tirana Logistic Park offers to the businesses many reasons to be placed in it. The logistic park is positioned in the largest industrial area of Albania, in a demographic area that provides skilled workforce and covers about 1.2 million inhabitants in a radius only  of distance between Tirana and Durres. Within a 4-hour trucking distance is a population base of nearly 8 million people. TLP is well positioned with access to the Port of Durrës, one of the only deep-water ports in South East Europe, as well as direct access to the new highways to Kosovo, Macedonia and Montenegro.
The park is easily accessed from the main highways, is next to the railway and port of Durrës. The park itself has a dedicated railway spur line that allows rail transport to the main ports of Albania or to other countries.

References

External links
 Top Logistics & Transportation Companies on the 2013
 Tlp.al

Buildings and structures in Tirana